is a 2008 Japanese film.

Plot
Four segments shot as if they are the climax of four action movies by four different directors.

External links
 Japanese Homepage 

2008 action films
2008 films
2000s Japanese-language films
Toei Company films
2000s Japanese films